Ronnie Fitzroy Rowe Jr., credited professionally as Ronnie Rowe or Ronnie Rowe Jr., is a Canadian film and television actor. He is most noted for his film role as the title character in Black Cop, for which he won the Vancouver Film Critics Circle award for Best Actor in a Canadian Film at the Vancouver Film Critics Circle Awards 2017, and his recurring role as Lieutenant R. A. Bryce in the television series Star Trek: Discovery.

He is slated to have a major role in the forthcoming drama series The Porter.

References

External links

21st-century Canadian male actors
Canadian male film actors
Canadian male television actors
Canadian male voice actors
Canadian male stage actors
Black Canadian male actors
Living people
Year of birth missing (living people)